Derbyshire County Cricket Club in 1958 represents the cricket season when the English club Derbyshire had been playing eighty-seven years. It was their fifty-fourth  season in the County Championship and they won nine matches in the County Championship to  finish fifth.

1958 season
Derbyshire played 28 games in the County Championship,  one match against Oxford University, and one against the touring New Zealanders.  They won ten matches altogether, and ended fifth in the County Championship. 
Donald Carr was in his fourth season  as captain. Charles Lee was  top scorer. Les Jackson  took most wickets for Derbyshire and topped the national bowler list with 143 wickets. His bowling average of 10.99 has not been exceeded since. Hampshire's score of 23 in the match at the Ind Coope ground remains the record for lowest runs in a match against  Derbyshire

The only new player was Jim Brailsford who made his three first-class career appearances for Derbyshire during the season.

Matches

{| class="wikitable" width="100%"
! bgcolor="#efefef" colspan=6 | List of  matches
|- bgcolor="#efefef"
!No.
!Date
!V
!Result 
!Margin
!Notes
 |- 
|1
| 10 May 1958
| |Oxford University    The University Parks, Oxford 
 |bgcolor="#00FF00"|Won 
| 134 runs
|   HL Jackson 7-18; E Smith 6-70  
|- 
|2
| 14 May 1958
| Glamorgan   County Ground, Derby 
|bgcolor="#FFCC00"|Drawn
|
| Watkins 5-19; HJ Rhodes 5-35; McConnon 6-20   
|- 
|3
| 17 May 1958
| Leicestershire  Queen's Park, Chesterfield 
 |bgcolor="#FF0000"|Lost 
| 5 wickets
|  DC Morgan 6-36; Boshier 6-39  
|- 
|4
| 24 May 1958
| Warwickshire  County Ground, Derby 
|bgcolor="#FFCC00"|Drawn
|
| Gardner 122;  HL Jackson 6-74   
|- 
|5
| 28 May 1958
|  Gloucestershire  Queen's Park, Chesterfield 
|bgcolor="#FFCC00"|Drawn
|
|  C Lee 150;  HL Jackson 5-37  
|- 
|6
| 31 May 1958
| Northamptonshire   County Ground, Northampton 
 |bgcolor="#FF0000"|Lost 
| 48 runs
|  Manning 5-41  
|- 
|7
| 04 Jun 1958
| Gloucestershire   Ashley Down Ground, Bristol 
 |bgcolor="#FF0000"|Lost 
| 158 runs
| Young 141; C Gladwin 7-28; Cook 7-19; DC Morgan 5-52; Mortimore 7-26   
|- 
|8
| 07 Jun 1958
| Essex    Park Road Ground, Buxton  
|bgcolor="#FFCC00"|Drawn
|
|  Preston 5-36  
|- 
|9
| 11 Jun 1958
| New Zealand cricket team in England in 1958   County Ground, Derby 
|bgcolor="#FFCC00"|Drawn
|
|    
|- 
|10
| 14 Jun 1958
| Worcestershire Chester Road North Ground, Kidderminster 
 |bgcolor="#FF0000"|Lost 
| 9 wickets
| Outschoorn 113;  HL Jackson 5-53; Flavell 7-43   
|- 
|11
| 21 Jun 1958
| Surrey  Queen's Park, Chesterfield 
|bgcolor="#FFCC00"|Drawn
|
| Laker 5-64   
|- 
|12
| 25 Jun 1958
| Sussex    Central Recreation Ground, Hastings 
|bgcolor="#FFCC00"|Drawn
|
|   HL Jackson 5-28  
|- 
|13
| 28 Jun 1958
| Glamorgan  St Helen's, Swansea 
 |bgcolor="#00FF00"|Won 
| 5 wickets
|  C Gladwin 5-64  
|- 
|14
| 02 Jul 1958
| Somerset Recreation Ground, Bath 
 |bgcolor="#FF0000"|Lost 
| 4 runs
| Tremlett 118; C Gladwin 7-59   
|- 
|15
| 05 Jul 1958
| Yorkshire  Queen's Park, Chesterfield 
 |bgcolor="#FFCC00"|Drawn
|
| DC Morgan 5-66   
|- 
|16
|09 Jul 1958
| Lancashire   County Ground, Derby 
 |bgcolor="#FF0000"|Lost 
 | 6 wickets
| Statham 5-21   
|- 
|17
|12 Jul 1958
| Leicestershire Bath Grounds, Ashby-de-la-Zouch 
 |bgcolor="#00FF00"|Won 
 | Innings and 42 runs
|  HL Jackson 7-30 and 5-37   
|- 
|18
|16 Jul 1958
| Essex    Chalkwell Park, Westcliff-on-Sea  
 |bgcolor="#00FF00"|Won 
 | 2 wickets
|   HL Jackson 7-34; Bailey 8-29  
|- 
|19
|19 Jul 1958
| Nottinghamshire    Trent Bridge, Nottingham 
 |bgcolor="#00FF00"|Won 
 | Innings and 88 runs
| C Lee 147; HJ Rhodes 5-50; C Gladwin 5-35   
|- 
|20
|26 Jul 1958
| Nottinghamshire    Rutland Recreation Ground, Ilkeston 
 |bgcolor="#00FF00"|Won 
 | Innings and 2 runs
| C Gladwin 6-34 and 5-49; DC Morgan 5-10   
|- 
|21
|30 Jul 1958
| Middlesex     Queen's Park, Chesterfield 
|bgcolor="#FFCC00"|Drawn
 |
|  Bennett 6-79  
|- 
|22
|02 Aug 1958
| Warwickshire Edgbaston, Birmingham 
 |bgcolor="#00FF00"|Won 
 | 7 wickets
| C Gladwin 5-15   
|- 
|23
|06 Aug 1958
| Kent  St Lawrence Ground, Canterbury 
 |bgcolor="#FF0000"|Lost 
 | Innings and 8 runs
| Leary 101; Sayer 5-28;  HL Jackson 6-58   
|- 
|24
|09 Aug 1958
|  Sussex    County Ground, Derby 
|bgcolor="#FFCC00"|Drawn
 |
|   HL Jackson 6-61; Thomson 5-70  
|- 
|25
|13 Aug 1958
| Hampshire  Ind Coope Ground, Burton-on-Trent 
 |bgcolor="#00FF00"|Won 
 | 103 runs
| Heath 6-25 and 7-52;  HL Jackson 5-10   
|- 
|26
|16 Aug 1958
| Yorkshire Headingley, Leeds 
 |bgcolor="#FF0000"|Lost 
 | 86 runs
|  E Smith 5-38;  HL Jackson 7-53; Illingworth 5-51  
|- 
|27
|20 Aug 1958
|  WorcestershireQueen's Park, Chesterfield 
|bgcolor="#FFCC00"|Drawn
 |
|  DB Carr 5-48  
|- 
|28
|23 Aug 1958
| Kent County Ground, Derby 
 |bgcolor="#00FF00"|Won 
 | 132 runs
|  HL Jackson 5-33; C Gladwin 5-31   
|- 
|29
|27 Aug 1958
| Lancashire   Old Trafford, Manchester 
 |bgcolor="#FF0000"|Lost 
 | 6 wickets
|  HL Jackson 5-32; Statham 5-31   
|- 
|30
|30 Aug 1958
| Hampshire   Dean Park, Bournemouth 
 |bgcolor="#00FF00"|Won 
| 5 wickets
|   HL Jackson 6-51 and 5-14  
|-

Statistics

County Championship batting averages

County Championship bowling averages

Wicket Keepers
GO Dawkes 	Catches 60, Stumpings 4

See also
Derbyshire County Cricket Club seasons
1958 English cricket season

References

1958 in English cricket
Derbyshire County Cricket Club seasons